The Hendy 281 Hobo was a British single-seat light monoplane designed by Basil B. Henderson and built by the Hendy Aircraft Company at Shoreham Airport in 1929. Only one aircraft was built, registered G-AAIG, and first flown in October 1929 by Edgar Percival.

It was a small low-wing cantilever monoplane with a fixed tailskid landing gear and powered by a 35 hp ABC Motors Scorpion II engine. It was rebuilt in  1934 with a 90 hp Pobjoy Cataract, mass balance ailerons and a modified landing gear.

Operational life
In the summer months of 1935 the Hendy Hobo was operated out of Hall Caine Airport, Isle of Man. Under the control of Flight lieutenant R. Duncanson, a former Chief Flying Instructor at the London Air Park and who had recently set up a flying school at Hall Caine. The Hendy Hobo captivated visitors and locals alike by performing a series of aerobatics over Ramsey Bay.

Loss
On 30 August 1940 it was destroyed by German bombing at Lympne Aerodrome.

Specifications (Hobo)

Notes

References
 A.J. Jackson, British Civil Aircraft since 1919 Volume 3, 1974, Putnam, London, Page 252

1920s British civil utility aircraft
Low-wing aircraft
Aircraft first flown in 1929
Hendy Aircraft Company aircraft
Single-engined tractor aircraft